Aleksandr Maksimovich Yakovlev (29 August 1927 - 26 May 2011), was a Russian politician and jurist who had served as the  to the Federal Assembly from 1994 to 1996.

Yakovlev was a Doctor of Law, Professor, a 1984 laureate of the State Prize of the USSR, and an Honoured Lawyer of Russia. He was also a People's Deputy of the USSR. He was one of the authors of the Constitution of Russia.

Biography
Aleksandr Yakovlev was born in Leningrad on 29 August 1927.

In 1989, Yakovlev was elected a People's Deputy of the USSR, and was a member of the Committee on Legislation, Law and Order of the Supreme Soviet of the Soviet Union.

In 1993, Yakovlev was the coordinator of a group of representatives of federal government bodies of the Constitutional Conference of Russia, which finalized the "presidential" draft of the Constitution of Russia. That same year, he had been a member of the UN Committee to Combat Torture. On 5 February 1996, he was relieved of his duties as the plenipotentiary representative. On 10 February, the office of the plenipotentiary representative in the Federal Assembly was abolished. That same year, he was elected rector of the Moscow New Law Institute. He was the chief researcher of the sector of criminal law and criminology of the Center for Theoretical Problems of Combating Crime of the Institute of State and Law of the Russian Academy of Sciences.

Yakovlev was the author of numerous publications on constitutional law, criminal law, criminology, sociology of law and crime. He was a visiting professor at the University of Alberta, York, Toronto, Rutgers University, Emory University.

Yakovlev died in Moscow on 26 May 2011.

References

1927 births
2011 deaths
Lawyers from Saint Petersburg
Recipients of the USSR State Prize
Soviet lawyers
20th-century Russian lawyers
21st-century Russian lawyers
Russian legal scholars
Russian criminologists
Members of the Congress of People's Deputies of the Soviet Union